Area code 940 is a telephone area code in the North American Numbering Plan (NANP) for the U.S. state of Texas in the Wichita Falls and Denton areas. It was created on July 7, 1997, in a split from area code 817.

Service area
Counties:
Archer, Baylor, Childress, Clay, Cooke, Cottle, Denton, Foard, Grayson, Hardeman, Haskell, Jack, Knox, Montague, Palo Pinto, Parker, Stonewall, Throckmorton, Wichita, Wilbarger, Wise, and Young

Towns and cities:
Alvord, Archer City, Argyle, Aubrey, Bellevue, Benjamin, Bluegrove, Bowie, Boyd, Bridgeport, Bryson, Burkburnett, Byers, Cee Vee, Chico, Childress, Chillicothe, Corinth, Crowell, Decatur, Dennis, Denton, Electra, Era, Forestburg, Gainesville, Gordon, Goree, Graford, Graham, Greenwood, Harrold, Haskell, Henrietta, Holliday, Iowa Park, Jacksboro, Jermyn, Justin, Kamay, Knox City, Krum, Lantana, Lake Dallas, Lindsay, Loving, Megargel, Millsap, Mineral Wells, Mingus, Montague, Muenster, Munday, Myra, Newark, Newcastle, Nocona, O'Brien, Oklaunion, Old Glory, Olney, Palo Pinto, Paradise, Perrin, Petrolia, Pilot Point, Ponder, Poolville, Quanah, Ringgold, Rochester, Rosston, Rule, Saint Jo, Sanger, Santo, Scotland, Seymour, Sheppard Air Force Base, Slidell, South Bend, Sunset, Tell, Throckmorton, Tioga, Valley View, Vernon, Weinert, Whitt, Wichita Falls, Windthorst and  Woodson

Ten-digit dialing
Prior to October 2021, area code 940 had telephone numbers assigned for the central office code 988. In 2020, 988 was designated nationwide as a dialing code for the National Suicide Prevention Lifeline, which created a conflict for exchanges that permit seven-digit dialing. This area code was therefore scheduled to transition to ten-digit dialing by October 24, 2021.

See also
List of Texas area codes

References

External links
 List of exchanges from AreaCodeDownload.com, 940 Area Code

940
940
Wichita County, Texas